Kollegal is one of the major taluks in the Chamarajanagara District of Karnataka State in the south of India. It is also the largest taluk in Karnataka, Kollegal is well known for its silk industry which attracts traders from all over the state.

History 
Until 1956, Kollegal was part of the Coimbatore district of the Madras Presidency. The States Reorganisation Act of 1956 moved Kollegal to Karnataka primarily organising it along linguistic lines. Kollegal is the name derived from the names of two hermits namely 'Kauhala' and 'Galava' who were believed to be instrumental in the development of Kollegal. Kollegal, also called "Silk City", is famous for its handloom silk saree industry. Kollegal is one of the larger taluks in Karnataka and was previously the largest. Plans are underway to divide Kollegal, making Hanur the capital of the new taluk in the Chamarajanagara District. This separation has been ongoing for years is not yet entirely in effect.

Kollegal serves as a center for pre-university education in the region. Well known schools in Kollegal include Lions High School, Sree Vasavi Vidya Kendra, St. Francis Assisi High School, Nisarga Independent PU college, Seventh Day Adventist High School, and Mudigundam Gurukaar Subappa Veerappa (MGSV), and Mahadeshwara Degree College.

Singanalur, Kollegal is the hometown of Legendary Kannada thespian, the demigod of Karnataka, Dr.Rajkumar. Kollegal was one of the areas which played host to the activities of Veerappan, a notorious bandit who smuggled sandalwood and poached elephants for their tusks.

Many tourists visit the Kollegal area. The Malai Mahadeshwara Hills, and the waterfalls at Hogenakkal near Male Mahadeshwara hills and the waterfalls of Gagana Chukki and Barachukki at Shivanasamudra (also known as Bluff) are popular destinations. In Kollegal, there is a small hill called "Maradi Gudda" which is located in the heart of the city. It also includes BRT Tiger Reserve (2011) Biligiriranga Hillswhich is approximately 25–30 km from the town, which is a home to many fauna and flora including mammals like Tigers, Leopards, Indian Elephant, Indian Guar and the Sloth Bear.

Transportation 
Kollegal is connected by two national highways:
 NH 209 this starts from Bengaluru-Dindigul via Coimbatore, Kollegal
 NH 212 this starts from Kollegal to Calicut, via Narasipura, Mysuru

The nearest railway stations are Chamarajanagara  and Mysuru (MYS) . Kollegal is the main junction where you can enter Salem, Coimbatore, Ooty, Kozhikode from Mysuru & Bengaluru.
The K.Gudi (Kyathadevara Gudi) Wilderness camp run by the jungle lodges and resorts (a government of Karnataka undertaking) is near the B.R hills.

There are two bus routes from Bengaluru to Kollegal:
 Bengaluru > Maddur > Malavalli > Kollegal (Via NH 275) Bengaluru Mysuru highway, take left diversion at Maddur after 80 km from Bengaluru
 Bengaluru > Kanakapura > Halaguru > Malavalli > Kollegal (Via NH 209)

Karnataka government buses from Bengaluru ply from MCTC which is popularly known as Satellite bus terminal in Mysuru Road and also from Kalasipalyam. Since the town was in Coimbatore district in the past, buses run between Coimbatore and Kollegal.

Geography 
Since the town is on the foothills of the Western Ghats, it is home to a mixed topography. Temperature is moderate.

Demographics 
 India census Kollegal had a population of 57,149. Males constitute 51% of the population and females 49%. Kollegal has an average literacy rate of 69%, higher than the national average of 59.5%: male literacy is 74%, and female literacy is 64%. In Kollegal, 10% of the population is under 6 years of age.

People in Kollegal speak a variation of Kannada distinct from that spoken in Mysuru and Bengaluru. There are 25,000 Tamil native speakers in Kollegal Taluk. There was a trust for Tamil peoples welfare activity named Kollegal Tamil Sangam.

College and schools 

MCKC High School, Lions School and PU college, Seventh Day Adventist English school, St. Francis Assisi School and PU college, RC mission, Sree Vasavi Vidya Kendra, Mahadeshwara College, JSS Women's College And College For Nursing are the oldest educational institutions in Kollegal offering best education. Manasa degree college and school and its PU college is a decade old private institution. Wisdom school is a recently opened private institution.

Image gallery

Location

See also 
 Hanur
 Male Mahadeshwara Hills
 Musicians

References

External links 

 Kollegal Online Information Website
 Kollegal Municipal Corporation Official Website
 Kollegal Photos
 

Cities and towns in Chamarajanagar district